Telefónica Germany GmbH & Co. OHG (also called Telefónica Deutschland ) is a provider of broadband, landline and mobile telecommunications in Germany. The company trades as O2 (typeset as O2).

The company was renamed from Telefónica O2 Germany to Telefónica Germany on 1 April 2011 following the completion of a merger with HanseNet. Telefónica Germany purchased E-Plus on 1 October 2014, unifying the business under O2 brand on 3 February 2016. Telefónica Germany's main competitors are Telekom Deutschland (Deutsche Telekom's German private customer unit) and Vodafone.

History 

Telefónica Germany was founded in 1995 as Viag Interkom, as a joint venture between British Telecommunications (45%), VIAG (45%) and Telenor (10%). Viag Interkom was awarded Germany's second GSM-1800 (also known as E-Netz (de; lit. E-Network in Germany) license in February 1997 and began operations on 1 February 1998 in eight cities.

In 2001, BT acquired VIAGs remaining shares for €11.4 billion, and the company was renamed BT Germany, it became a part of BT Wireless, a group of subsidiary companies owned by BT. BT Wireless demerged from BT in 2001 to form mmO2 plc and Viag Interkom was relaunched as O2 Germany.

In 2005, mmO2 plc. of which O2 Germany is a part, was acquired by Spanish telecoms giant, Telefónica. O2 Germany rebranded as Telefónica O2 Germany GmbH.

In 2011, Telefónica O2 Germany merged with HanseNet and renamed the merged company to Telefónica Germany.

In September 2014, Telefónica Germany announced the sale of €3.62 billion in new stock to help finance the acquisition of its competitor E-Plus from KPN. As part of the purchase, Telefónica reduced its stake in its subsidiary to 62.1%.

In June 2020, Telefónica announced the sale of 10,100 mobile sites to Telxius for € 1.5 billion.

Products 
Telefónica Germany operates second, third and fourth  generation mobile networks, allowing customers to use GPRS, EDGE, UMTS up to HSPA+ and LTE for data connections. Most of O2 plans are available both in a pre- and post-paid version, including the all-in-one-flatrates called o2 o and o2 on for enterprise customers. Beside the core business, Telefónica Germany is one of the largest retailers for mobile phones and tablets without a SIM lock. It was the first operator offering both Apple's iPhone 4 and the iPad 2. Also, Telefónica Germany offers hosting services for large and midsized companies, serving some well-known portals including Spiegel Online and Sevenload. Together with Microsoft and Visionapp, Telefónica Germany provides a cloud service for Hosted Exchange.

In December 2018, Telefónica Deutschland started to test the 5G on 5 sites in Berlin, in a partnership with Nokia. In December 2019 the company announced the rollout of the 5G Network, starting with Berlin, Hamburg, Munich, Cologne, and Frankfurt. Telefónica Deutschland is using Huawei and Nokia technology on the mobile radio sites.

References

External links 
 

Telecommunications companies of Germany
Mobile phone companies of Germany
Internet service providers of Germany
Telecommunications companies established in 1995
Companies in the TecDAX
Companies in the MDAX
German subsidiaries of foreign companies